Hibbertia calycina, commonly known as the lesser guinea flower, is a species of flowering plant in the family Dilleniaceae and is endemic to south-eastern Australia. It is a small shrub with linear leaves and yellow flowers with eight to eighteen stamens in a single cluster on one side of the two carpels.

Description
The flowers are arranged on the ends of branchlets and are sessile. There are eight to eighteen stamens arranged in a single cluster on one side of the two woolly-hairy carpels. Flowering occurs from September to November.

Taxonomy
This species was first described in 1817 by Augustin Pyramus de Candolle and given the name Pleurandra calycina in Regni Vegetabilis Systema Naturale. In 1955, Norman Arthur Wakefield changed the name to Hibbertia calycina in The Victorian Naturalist.

Distribution and habitat
Lesser guinea flower grows in woodland on rocky slopes on the ranges and tablelands of southern New South Wales, the Australian Capital Territory and north-eastern Victoria. It also occurs in a few places in eastern Tasmania where it is very rare.

Conservation status
Hibbertia calycina is listed as "vulnerable" under the Tasmanian Government Threatened Species Protection Act 1995.

References

calycina
Flora of New South Wales
Flora of the Australian Capital Territory
Flora of Victoria (Australia)
Flora of Tasmania
Plants described in 1817
Taxa named by Augustin Pyramus de Candolle